Nemu may refer to:

Nemu Asakura, a romantic interest in Da Capo
Nemu Kurotsuchi, a Shinigami vice-captain in Bleach